Clarence George Rautzhan (August 20, 1952 – January 9, 2016) was an American pitcher in Major League Baseball who played from 1977 to 1979 for the Los Angeles Dodgers and Milwaukee Brewers.

Career
Lance was offered a full athletic football scholarship to the University of Kentucky; when drafted in the third round pick for the Dodgers in 1970 (drafted right out of high school after he pitched a perfect game), decided to play baseball. He played  years in the Dodger minor league system and had the most complete games in the AA Eastern League for a single season in 1975. In 1976 he made the AAA Pacific Coast League all-star team.

Rautzhan was the winning pitcher in Game 3 of the 1977 NLCS against the Philadelphia Phillies, after the Dodgers came back from a two-out, 5-3 deficit in the top of the 9th inning thanks to key pinch hits by Vic Davalillo and Manny Mota. His father William Rautzhan also played baseball in minor league for the Chicago White Sox.

Rautzhan died of cancer in Myrtle Beach, South Carolina, on January 9, 2016, alongside his wife, Crystal, and daughter, Jaime.

References

External links

1952 births
2016 deaths
Albuquerque Dukes players
American expatriate baseball players in Canada
Bakersfield Dodgers players
Baseball players from Pennsylvania
Deaths from cancer in South Carolina
Daytona Beach Dodgers players
Holyoke Millers players
Los Angeles Dodgers players
Major League Baseball pitchers
Milwaukee Brewers players
Ogden Dodgers players
Sportspeople from Pottsville, Pennsylvania
Vancouver Canadians players
Waterbury Dodgers players